Jaspers is a Dutch patronymic surname (Jasper's). Notable people with the surname include:

Dick Jaspers (born 1965), Dutch carom billiards player
Eddy Jaspers (born 1956), Belgian football defender
Karl Jaspers (1883–1969), German-Swiss psychiatrist and philosopher
Jappe Jaspers (born 1998), Belgian cyclo-cross cyclist.
Jason Jaspers (born 1981), Canadian ice hockey centre
Hermes Jaspers (born 1965), American actor
John Baptist Jaspers (died 1691), Flemish painter and tapestry designer
Martijn Jaspers (born 1987), Dutch BMX rider
 (born 1935), Belgian architect
Stijn Jaspers (1961–1984), Dutch middle and long-distance runner

See also 
 48435 Jaspers, main-belt asteroid named for Karl Jaspers
 Jaspers, psychoactive food additive from Frank Herbert's novel The Santaroga Barrier, named for Karl Jaspers
 Jasper (disambiguation)
 Manhattan Jaspers and Lady Jaspers, the nicknames of the Manhattan College sports teams
Jaspers Lai (born 1987), Singapore actor

References

Dutch-language surnames
Patronymic surnames
Surnames from given names